The gayal (Bos frontalis), also known as the Drung ox or mithun, is a large domestic cattle distributed in Northeast India, Bangladesh, Myanmar and in Yunnan, China.

Taxonomy 
In his first description of 1804, Aylmer Bourke Lambert applied the binomial Bos frontalis to a domestic specimen probably from Chittagong.

In 2003, the International Commission on Zoological Nomenclature fixed the first available specific name based on a wild population that the name for this wild species is valid by virtue of its being antedated by a name based on a domestic form. Most authors have adopted the binomial Bos frontalis for the domestic species as valid for the taxon.

Phylogenetic analysis corroborates the taxonomic assessment that the gayal is an independent Bos species originating matrilineally from gaur, zebu and cattle.

Characteristics
The gayal differs in several important particulars from the gaur:
 It is somewhat smaller, with proportionately shorter limbs, and stands much lower at the withers.
 The ridge on the back is less developed, and bulls have a larger dewlap on the throat.
 The head is shorter and broader, with a perfectly flat forehead and a straight line between the bases of the horns.
 The thick and massive horns are less flattened and much less curved than in the gaur, extending almost directly outwards from the sides of the head, and curving somewhat upwards at the tips, but without any inward inclination. Their extremities are thus much farther apart than in the gaur.
 The female gayal is much smaller than the bull, and has scarcely any dewlap on the throat.
 The skin colour of the head and body is blackish-brown in both sexes, and the lower portion of the limbs are white or yellowish.
 The horns are of uniform blackish tint from base to tip.
Some domesticated gayals are parti-coloured, while others are completely white.

There are two major hypotheses on the origin of the gayal:
 It was domesticated from wild gaur;
 It is a hybrid descendant from crossing of wild gaur and domestic cattle, either Bos indicus or Bos taurus.

In 2020, Ranganathan Kamalakkannan et Al. found "phylogenetic analysis using complete mitochondrial genome sequences unambiguously suggested that gaur is the maternal ancestor of domestic mithun."

Analysis of the genome of the gayal was published in 2017.

Distribution and habitat 

Gayals are essentially inhabitants of hill-forests. In India, semi-domesticated gayals are kept by several ethnic groups living in the hills of Tripura, Mizoram, Assam, Arunachal Pradesh, Manipur and Nagaland. They also occur in the Chittagong Hill Tracts. In northern Burma, they occur in the Kachin State, and in adjacent Yunnan are found only in the Trung and Salween River basins.

The role of the mithun is central to the lives of many residents of these areas, including transhumant ones who pair mithun management with sago palm harvesting:

In Nagaland, the animals are kept semi-wild, and live in herds, being watched over by special caretakers assigned by the villages or the owner of the herd. They respond to a horn kept specially for the individual caretaker or actual owner to call them. From birth until the time of butchering or market, the Mithun remain in the herd, and roam mostly freely throughout the forests.

In culture 

To the Idu Mishmi, Nyishi people or Adi people  (Bangni-Booker Lhobas incl pasi, padam, minyong, Galong now Galo), the possession of gayal is the traditional measure of a family's wealth. Gayal are not milked or put to work but given supplementary care while grazing in the woods, until they are ritually slaughtered or killed for local consumption. Mithuns are wild and each family has a very indigenous marking as a cut on the ear.

The gayal is the state animal of Arunachal Pradesh and Nagaland. Gayals play an important role in the social life of the people in Arunachal Pradesh. Marriages are not fixed until the bridegroom's family gives at least one gayal to the bride's household.

Gayals are left in the forest, where they usually stay within a small perimeter. Females are usually aggressive when with calves, and there are instances known when people have been severely injured after being gored by one. Males are usually more docile.

In Mizoram and Manipur, it is called Sial, Siel, Se/Sia amongst the tribes of the Chin-Kuki-Mizo. It is the most essential and valuable commodity; the wealth of a person is often counted by the number of gayals. It is the sole animal used for sacrificial purposes and feast of merit. The tribes regard a human to be honourable if and when he holds a community feast of one or more gayal on one or more occasions.

National Research Centre on Mithun 
The National Research Centre on Mithun was established at Medziphema in the Chümoukedima District of Nagaland under the Indian Council of Agricultural Research.

The mandate of the institute was redefined in 1997 and 2006. Currently, the National Research Centre on Mithun is functioning for developing the scientific and sustainable mithun rearing system and for catering the needs of mithun farmers with the following mandates:
 Identification, evaluation and characterization of mithun germplasm available in the country.
 Conservation and improvement of mithun for meat and milk.
 Act as a repository of germplasm and information centre on mithun.

References 

Bovines
Mammals of China
Mammals of India
Mammals of Myanmar
Mammals of Bangladesh
Mammals described in 1804
Domesticated animals
Symbols of Arunachal Pradesh
Symbols of Nagaland